General elections were held in Paraguay on 9 May 1993. They were the first free elections in the country's 182-year history, the first with no military candidates since 1928, and the first since the adoption of a new constitution the previous summer. The presidential election was the first regular presidential election since the overthrow of longtime leader Alfredo Stroessner in 1989; incumbent Andrés Rodríguez was in office by virtue of winning a special election for the remainder of Stroessner's eighth term.

Rodríguez had promised not to run for re-election for a full term, and was prevented from doing so by the new constitution, which barred a sitting president from re-election even if they had only served a partial term. Juan Carlos Wasmosy of the Colorado Party won the presidential election with 41.8 percent of the vote. He took office on 15 August, becoming the first civilian to hold the post in 39 years.

The Colorado Party remained the largest party in the Chamber of Deputies and the Senate, but lost the absolute majority it had held since 1963. The opposition Authentic Radical Liberal Party and National Encounter Party together held a majority of the seats in both chambers, later supplemented by the Colorado Reconciliation Movement, which broke away from the Colorado Party. Voter turnout was 69.0% in the presidential elections, 67.6% in the Chamber elections and 69.4% in the Senate elections.

Conduct
The elections were not entirely peaceful. On election day, an opposition television channel was raked by gunfire, and government officials cut the phone lines of opposition parties and independent election monitors. However, the phone lines were restored after intervention from Jimmy Carter. Despite confirmed cases of fraud, independent analysts concluded that the fraudulent activity had no effect on the outcome, and that Wasmosy's eight-point margin of victory was large enough to offset any illicit activity. Carter's team of international observers noted that opposition candidates tallied almost 60 percent of the vote between them.

Previously, there had been only two years of liberal democracy in Paraguay before the 1989 coup. For much of that time, opposition had been barely tolerated, even when it was nominally legal. Even after Stroessner lifted a three-decade state of siege in 1987, opposition parties and newspapers continued to be suppressed, often brutally. In this climate, Stroessner had won all six of his contested bids for president (he appeared alone on the ballot in 1954 and 1958) with 70 percent or more of the vote, only dropping below 80 percent once.

Results

President

Senate

Chamber of Deputies

Notes

References

Paraguay
1993 in Paraguay
Elections in Paraguay
Presidential elections in Paraguay
May 1993 events in South America
Election and referendum articles with incomplete results